The 1979–80 Norwegian 1. Divisjon season was the 41st season of ice hockey in Norway. Ten teams participated in the league, and Furuset IF won the championship.

Regular season

Playoffs

External links 
 Norwegian Ice Hockey Federation

Nor
GET-ligaen seasons
1979 in Norwegian sport
1980 in Norwegian sport